Jūratė Ladavičiūtė (born 19 February 1985) is a female freestyle swimmer from Lithuania, and the youngest member (15 years, 207 days) of the national squad competing at the 2000 Summer Olympics in Sydney, Australia. As the only women she participated in the 50m and 100m Freestyle. In both events she didn't reach the final.

References
 Profile

1985 births
Living people
Lithuanian female freestyle swimmers
Swimmers at the 2000 Summer Olympics
Olympic swimmers of Lithuania
Place of birth missing (living people)